Haustrum haustorium, common name:  the brown or  dark rock shell, is a large species of predatory sea snail, a marine gastropod mollusc in the family Muricidae, the murex snails or rock snails.

Taxonomy 
Haustrum haustorium used to be the only species in the genus Haustrum.  However, Beu (2004) reclassified a number of New Zealand's whelks, considering species in the genus Lepsiella to be synonymous with the genus Haustrum.

Distribution 
This species occurs in New Zealand.

Shell description 

A reliable characteristic for distinguishing Haustum haustorium from its congeners is the angle by which the aperture lip inserts on the shell:  In Haustrum haustorium the angle is near-perpendicular, whereas in other species the angle is more acute (~45 degrees).  Tan (2003) provides the most recent review.

Ecology

Habitat 

This rock snail's typical habitat is the mid and lower eulittoral zone of New Zealand's semi-exposed rocky intertidal shores.  It is less common on algal-dominated sheltered shores.

References

 Powell A W B, New Zealand Mollusca, William Collins Publishers Ltd, Auckland, New Zealand 1979 
 Beu, A. G. 1990. Molluscan generic diversity of New Zealand Neogene stages: extinction and biostratigraphic events. - Palaeogeography, Palaeoclimatology, Palaeoecology 77: 279-288.
 Glen Pownall, New Zealand Shells and Shellfish, Seven Seas Publishing Pty Ltd, Wellington, New Zealand 1979 
 Miller M & Batt G, Reef and Beach Life of New Zealand, William Collins (New Zealand) Ltd, Auckland, New Zealand 1973
 Tan, K. S. 2003. "Phylogenetic analysis and taxonomy of some southern Australian and New Zealand Muricidae (Mollusca: Neogastropoda)". Journal of Natural History 37: 911–1028.

Haustrum (gastropod)
Gastropods of New Zealand
Gastropods described in 1791
Taxa named by Johann Friedrich Gmelin